The .22 Accelerator is a special loading of the .30-30, .308, and .30-06 cartridges that is manufactured by Remington.

Description
It consists of a sub-caliber  diameter bullet, held in a .30-caliber  six-fingered plastic sabot with a hollowed base.  

Usage
The cartridge allows for using a large-caliber rifle for varmint shooting, although the accuracy is somewhat diminished. 

The advantage, however, is the extremely high muzzle velocity from factory-loaded ammunition.

References

Pistol and rifle cartridges